Staromakarovo (İśke Maqar) is a rural locality (a village) in Meselinsky Selsoviet, Aurgazinsky District, Bashkortostan, Russia. The population was 172 as of 2010. There are 7 streets.

Geography 
Staromakarovo is located 29 km south of Tolbazy (the district's administrative centre) by road. Solovyovka is the nearest rural locality.

References 

Rural localities in Aurgazinsky District